Ernest Pratt King was an American college football head coach who was Delaware football program's sixth head coach. He led them to an 0–5–1 overall record in 1907—his only season.

College playing career
King played four years at Mercersburg Academy. He then attended the University of Chicago, where he played for one season. He then spent the next three years playing at Purdue University.

Professional playing career
King was also a professional American football player with the Massillon Tigers. He was signed by the Tigers in 1906 to play in the Ohio League championship against the Canton Bulldogs in a two-game series. Massillon would go on to lose the first game of the series, 10–5, but won the second game (and the championship) by a score of 13–6 and clinched the 1906 league championship. However rumors of a gamblers fixing the game tainted the championship.

Head coaching record

References

Year of birth missing
Year of death missing
American football guards
Chicago Maroons football players
Delaware Fightin' Blue Hens football coaches
Massillon Tigers players
Purdue Boilermakers football players
Mercersburg Academy alumni